Local elections took place in many parts of England on 7 May 1998. All London borough council seats were elected as well a third of the seats on each of the Metropolitan Boroughs. Some unitary authorities and District councils also had elections.  There were no local elections in Scotland, Wales or Northern Ireland.

These elections took place on the same day as the referendum on establishing the Greater London Authority.

The governing Labour Party, contesting its first national elections since returning to government 12 months previously, enjoyed great success, now having control of 94 councils, with the second placed Liberal Democrats now controlling 14 and the opposition Conservatives (now led by William Hague) a mere eight.

Summary of results

England

London boroughs
In all 32 London boroughs the whole council was up for election.

Metropolitan boroughs
All 36 English Metropolitan borough councils had one third of their seats up for election.

Unitary authorities

Whole council
The whole of the Isle of Wight council was up for election.

Third of council
In 9 English Unitary authorities one third of the council was up for election.

District councils
In 88 English district authorities one third of the council was up for election.

‡ New ward boundaries

References

Vote 1998 BBC News
The local elections of 7 May 1998 and the London referendum. House of Commons Library Research Paper 98/59.
"Local Elections results", The Times 9 May 1998 page 46

 
1998
Local elections